Sugworth is a  geological Site of Special Scientific Interest north of Abingdon-on-Thames in Oxfordshire. It is a Geological Conservation Review site.

This site dates to the Cromerian Stage, an interglacial over half a million years ago. It is a river channel cut into Kimmeridge Clay of the Late Jurassic, and it has rich deposits of vertebrates, ostracods, molluscs, beetles, plant remains and pollen.

References

Sites of Special Scientific Interest in Oxfordshire
Geological Conservation Review sites